Moominhouse (Swedish: Muminhuset) is a fictional house, where the Moomins live, in the tales by Finnish author Tove Jansson. Its tall, round shape is said to be patterned after the porcelain cocklestoves behind which the Moomins' ancestors used to live.

The house is described and depicted in many of the books and comics about the Moomins and Tove Jansson even drew blueprints of it as an illustration for Finn Family Moomintroll. When she built a model of the house in the 1970s, it was, however, not made round; this 2.5-metre-tall model is now on display in the Moomin Museum in Tampere. She once explained the difference as that "it wasn't easy to know what the house looked like before it was built", a typical example of her humour. The full-size moominhouse built in 1993 at the theme park Moomin World in Naantali was, however, created looking more like Jansson's own earlier drawings of the house, while the moominhouse in Akebono Kodomo mori park in Hannō in Japan again is quite different.

References

Fictional houses
Moomin locations
Fictional buildings and structures originating in literature